Morgan Kamin (born 23 January 1994) is a French footballer who plays as a midfielder for Thonon Évian.

Career statistics

References

1994 births
Living people
Association football midfielders
French footballers
Ligue 2 players
Thonon Evian Grand Genève F.C. players
Louhans-Cuiseaux FC players
SC Toulon players
FC Annecy players